Daniel Van de Wiele (born November 10, 1956 in Leuven, Belgium), is a boxing referee, most notable for his refereeing of the WBC heavyweight titlefight between Lennox Lewis and Hasim Rahman on April 21, 2001.  He has also refereed the 2009 the WBC heavyweight titlefight between Vitaly Klitschko and Juan Carlos Gómez, which ended in the ninth round with Gómez unable to continue.

Work as referee

Van de Wiele started his work as a boxing referee on December 13, 1980.  Since then, Daniel Van de Wiele has refereed over 680 titlefights.  His most notable fights refereeing include the 2001 WBC Heavyweight title and the 2009 WBC Heavyweight title.

Personal
Daniel Van de Wiele is married to Olena Pobyvailo. They have a daughter, Sophie, and Daniel has 2 children from a first marriage,  Koen and Dorien.

References

External links
http://www.boxrec.com/list_bouts.php?human_id=400862&cat=referee
http://www.boxrec.com/list_bouts.php?human_id=400862&cat=judge

Boxing referees
1956 births
Belgian referees and umpires
Living people
Sportspeople from Leuven